Matthew Sunderland (born c. 1972) is a New Zealand actor, writer, and director. He performed the lead role of David Gray in the feature film Out of the Blue, based on the events of the Aramoana Massacre. At the New Zealand Screen Awards in 2008 he won Best Actor Award for this role.

Education 
Sunderland graduated from Toi Whakaari in 1997.

Career 
Sunderland starred as Uncle Rory in Daniel Borgman's debut feature The Weight of Elephants. He was nominated for a Best Actor Award in the 2006 NZ Screen Awards for Nature's Way, which screened In Competition at the Cannes Film Festival in 2006.

His other feature film roles include A Song of Good, Christmas, Stringer Woodenhead Existence, and The Devil's Rock.

Sunderland made his directorial and screenwriting debut with the short film Tuffy, which deals with estrangement between a father and son, in small town New Zealand.

In 2013, Sunderland played in the stage adaption of Kate Grenville’s Booker Prize-shortlisted The Secret River with the Sydney Theatre Company, which toured throughout Australia. He also appeared in Shortland Street as White Dragon, in a storyline concluding the three-year Kieran Mitchell story arc.

In 2016, Sunderland played the role of a drunken man resisting alien abduction in the music video for "Bergschrund" by DJ Shadow and Nils Frahm.

Sunderland played the chemist, Joseph Pritchard in the 2020 miniseries The Luminaries.

Filmography

Film

Television

References

External links 
Johnson & Laird Agency Talent Profile
 
 

Living people
New Zealand male film actors
Toi Whakaari alumni
1970s births